Sandu Ciprian Iovu (born 26 January 1996) is a Romanian professional footballer who plays as a forward for SC Popești-Leordeni.

References

External links
 
 

1996 births
Living people
Sportspeople from Hunedoara
Romanian footballers
Association football forwards
Liga I players
Liga II players
CSM Ceahlăul Piatra Neamț players
Sepsi OSK Sfântu Gheorghe players
CS Știința Miroslava players
ACS Viitorul Târgu Jiu players
FC Unirea Dej players
CSM Deva players
21st-century Romanian people